Greaves Peak is a conspicuous sharp, dark, double-pointed rocky peak rising to 240 m in the northwest of Greenwich Island in the South Shetland Islands, Antarctica.  The peak surmounts Yakoruda Glacier to the southeast, Archar Peninsula to the west and Razlog Cove to the northwest.

The feature is named after Captain Alexander Benjamin Greaves, Master of the British sealing ship Brussa which visited the South Shetlands in 1821–22.

Location

See also
 Greenwich Island

Maps
 L.L. Ivanov et al. Antarctica: Livingston Island and Greenwich Island, South Shetland Islands. Scale 1:100000 topographic map. Sofia: Antarctic Place-names Commission of Bulgaria, 2005.
 L.L. Ivanov. Antarctica: Livingston Island and Greenwich, Robert, Snow and Smith Islands. Scale 1:120000 topographic map.  Troyan: Manfred Wörner Foundation, 2009.

References
 SCAR Composite Antarctic Gazetteer.

Mountains of Greenwich Island